Mardiyanto (born 21 November 1946 in Surakarta, Central Java) is an Indonesian politician and former General. He was the governor of Central Java beginning in 1998, and was re-elected as a PDI-P party candidate in 2003. He held the position of Minister of Home Affairs until 2009 when he was succeeded by Gamawan Fauzi.

References

1946 births
Living people
People from Surakarta
Indonesian generals
Governors of Central Java
Interior ministers of Indonesia
Indonesian Democratic Party of Struggle politicians